Catotricha americana is a species of basal gall midges in the family Cecidomyiidae. It is the type species of the genus and has only been confirmed to occur in New Hampshire. This species was first described by American entomologist Ephraim Porter Felt in 1908.

References

Further reading

 
 

Cecidomyiidae
Articles created by Qbugbot
Insects described in 1908

Taxa named by Ephraim Porter Felt
Diptera of North America